Mahieu is both a surname and a given name. Notable people with the name include:

Surname:
Albert Mahieu (1860-1926), French politician.
Jacques de Mahieu (1915–1990), French Argentine anthropologist and Peronist
Jesse Mahieu (born 1978), Dutch field hockey player
Thomas Mahieu, 16th-century French politician and bibliophile

Given name:
Mahieu de Gant, Flemish trouvère
Mahieu le Juif, French trouvère
Mahieu de Quercy, French troubadour

See also
Matthew (disambiguation)

Surnames of French origin